The radjah shelduck (Radjah radjah), is a species of shelduck found mostly in New Guinea and Australia, and also on some of the Moluccas. It is known alternatively as the raja shelduck, black-backed shelduck, or in Australia as the Burdekin duck.

Taxonomy 
The specific name radjah  is from the Moluccan name Radja for the radjah
shelduck on the island of Buru in Indonesia.

Formerly placed in the genus Tadorna, it differs markedly from other members in external morphology and mtDNA cytochrome b sequence data, suggesting its status should be reinvestigated. Current classification places it in its own monotypic genus Radjah.

Description 

Both the male and female of the species are mostly white, with dark wing-tips and a distinctive "collar" of dark feathers.  Seen from above in flight the birds have green bands on the tops of their wings. The female has a harsh rattle and the male has a breathy, sore-throat whistle.

Distribution and habitat 
The radjah shelduck inhabits the mangrove forests and coastline of New Guinea (West Papua and Papua New Guinea) and Australia, and some of the Moluccas in eastern Indonesia. In Australia, its primary range is coastal tropical northern Australia, from central Queensland through northern Northern Territory (including Kakadu National Park) to the Kimberley in Western Australia. The radjah shelduck is listed as a protected bird in all states of Australia and penalties exist for harming or disturbing them.

The species prefers the brackish waters of mangrove flats and paperbark tree swamps, but will visit freshwater swamps, lagoons, and billabongs further inland during the wet season.

Behaviour 
The radjah shelduck forms long-term pair-bonds, and is usually encountered in lone pairs or small flocks. During the wet season the males commonly become very irritable, and have been observed attacking their mates.

The diet consists mainly of mollusks, insects, sedge materials and algae. Pairs start searching for nesting sites during the months of January and February. They nest close to their primary food source, often in the hollow limbs of trees, which makes habitat destruction a particular issue.

The radjah shelduck does not use nesting materials except for some self-supplied down feathers. Egg-laying is usually done by May or June, but depends on the extent of the wet season. The clutches range from 6 to 12 eggs. Incubation time is about 30 days.

References

External links 

 Radjah Shelduck article on the Honolulu Zoo website

radjah shelduck
Birds of the Maluku Islands
Birds of New Guinea
Birds of the Northern Territory
Birds of Queensland
radjah shelduck
Taxa named by René Lesson